The 2021 Island X-Prix (formally the 2021 Enel X Island X-Prix) was an Extreme E off-road race that was held on 23 and 24 October 2021 at Capo Teulada, in the Sulcis-Iglesiente region of the Italian island of Sardinia. It was the fourth round of the electric off-road racing car series' inaugural season. The final was won by championship leaders Molly Taylor and Johan Kristoffersson for the Rosberg X Racing team, ahead of Abt Cupra XE and JBXE.

Classification

Qualifying

Notes:
 Tie-breakers were determined by Super Sector times.
  – Team awarded 5 additional points for being fastest in the Super Sector.

Semi-final 1

Notes:
  – Andretti United Extreme E originally got further in the lap than Team X44, but were classified last as a penalty for causing a collision.

Semi-final 2

Crazy Race

Final

References

External links
 

|- style="text-align:center"
|width="35%"|Previous race:2021 Arctic X-Prix
|width="30%"|Extreme E Championship2021 season
|width="35%"|Next race:2021 Jurassic X-Prix
|- style="text-align:center"
|width="35%"|Previous race:N/A
|width="30%"|Island X-Prix
|width="35%"|Next race:2022 Island X-Prix
|- style="text-align:center"

Island X-Prix
Island X-Prix
Island X-Prix